Frederick John Eversley (born 1941, in Brooklyn, New York) is an American sculptor who lives in Venice Beach, California and Soho, New York. He creates sculptures from cast resin and other materials, "a medium that makes possible many different effects, ranging from opacity to complete transparency. Eversley casts resin, a technically demanding material, into large cylinders; then, through cutting and polishing alters their form." Eversley's first solo exhibition at the Whitney Museum was in 1970; later, in 1977, he became the first artist-in-residence at the Smithsonian Institution's Air and Space Museum.

Early career

Eversley was trained as an engineer; from 1963 until 1967 "he was a senior project engineer, instrumentation systems, at Wyle Laboratories, where he was responsible for supervising the design and construction of high-intensity acoustic and vibration test laboratories at NASA facilities."

He attended Carnegie Institute of Technology in Pittsburgh where he earned a B.S. in electrical engineering. He moved to Venice, California, in 1964 where he became friends with several Los Angeles artists, and retired from engineering in 1967 to become an artist full-time.  "Using plastic resin, he developed a formal sculptural language that reflected the West Coast style that came to be known as 'finish fetish,' a seemingly more decorative approach to minimalism that appeared to take its cues from the synthetic materials and mechanized surfaces of hot rods, surfboards, and the aerospace industry."

Artworks
 
According to the Smithsonian American Art Museum, "His cast plastic sculptures employ polished surfaces and translucent colors that interact with the natural light. In this way, the artist makes what he calls 'kinetic art' that does not need mechanical movement or artificial effects. Eversley is inspired by energy in all its forms, and his work explores ways to capture and make use of the earth's natural resources."

According to the Getty, "The highly translucent, reflective surfaces of these sculptures produced an optical experience at once elegant and mystical. Eversley continued using basic geometric forms to experiment with light refraction, and in the 1970s incorporated parabolic curves into his work that evoke mirrors or large lenses."

Eversley's work was featured at the Muscarelle Museum of Art in 2017 in an exhibition titled "Fred Eversley: Black, White, Gray and Transparent Color." He has works in the permanent collections of the Whitney Museum of American Art, the Smithsonian American Art Museum and Oakland Museum of California.

Selected awards and honors

Artist of The Year Award, LA Artcore, Los Angeles, CA, 2010
City of Florence Award, Biennale Internazionale Dell'arte Contemporanea Florence, Italy, 2003
First Prize – Sculpture, Biennale Internazionale Dell'arte Contemporanea Florence, Italy, 2001
First Artist in Residence, Smithsonian Institution, Washington, D. C., 1977–80
Individual Artist Fellowship Grant, National Endowment for the Arts, Washington, D. C., 1972

References

1941 births
20th-century American sculptors
Living people
21st-century American sculptors
21st-century male artists
American male sculptors
Artists from Brooklyn
Carnegie Mellon University alumni
People from Venice, Los Angeles
Artists from Los Angeles
Sculptors from California
Sculptors from New York (state)
African-American sculptors